Rana (IAST: Rāṇā,) is a historical title denoting an absolute Hindu monarch in the Indian subcontinent. Today, it is used as a hereditary name in the Indian and Pakistani subcontinent.
"Rana" was formerly used as a title of martial sovereignty by Rajput kings in India. 
Rani is the title for the wife of a rana or a female monarch. It also applies to the wife of a raja. Compound titles include rana sahib, ranaji, rana bahadur, and maharana.

Usage in the Indian subcontinent

"Rana" was formerly used as a title of martial sovereignty by Rajput kings in India. Sisodia rulers of Mewar used the title of Mahārāṇā (महाराणा) extensively in their royal charters. Today, members of some Rajput clans in Indian subcontinent use it as a hereditary title. In Pakistan, mostly Muslims—but also some Hindus in Sindh (present-day Pakistan)—use it as a hereditary title. Umerkot, a state in Sindh, has a Hindu Thakur Sodha Rajput ruler who uses the title. 

In the 16th century, Rana Prasad, the monarch of Umerkot, gave refuge to the Mughal prince Humayun and his wife, Hamida Banu Begum, who had fled from military defeat at the hands of Sher Shah Suri. Their son Akbar was born in the fort of the Rana of Umerkot.

The head of the Kunwar nobles of Nepal, Jung Bahadur Kunwar, took the title of Rana(ji) and Shree Teen Maharaja after consolidation of his post of Prime Minister of Nepal. This dynasty controlled administration of the Kingdom of Nepal from 1846 until 1951, reducing the Shah monarch to a figurehead and making Prime Minister and other government positions hereditary.

As a title 
 The Kolis of India used the title of Rana and ruled over Princely State of Shevdivadar and Sinhagad fort wae ruled by Koli Rana Nag Nayak who challenged the Delhi sultanate's Sultan Muhammad bin Tughluq.

References

Royal titles
Titles in India
Titles in Pakistan
Titles of national or ethnic leadership
Cultural history of India
History of Pakistan